Acrocercops aethalota is a species of moth of the family Gracillariidae, known from New Zealand. In 2019 Robert Hoare proposed that this species be provisionally assigned to the genus Eumetriochroa. However as this proposal needs further investigation this species is also currently known as Eumetriochroa (s.l.) aetholata.

The larval host plants are species in the genus Parsonsia. The larvae mine both the stems and leaves of these plants.

References

aethalota
Moths of New Zealand
Moths described in 1880
Endemic fauna of New Zealand
Taxa named by Edward Meyrick
Endemic moths of New Zealand